Sergio Gómez Cegarra (born 30 March 1991) is a Spanish footballer who plays for UE Cornellà as a defensive midfielder.

Football career
Born in Barcelona, Catalonia, Gómez played youth football with local UE Cornellà, making his senior debuts with Villarreal CF C in the 2010–11 Tercera División season. On 4 June 2011, he made his professional debut, appearing with the B-team in the last 23 minutes of a 1–2 away loss against Real Betis in the Segunda División.

In August 2011, Gómez was loaned to CF Palencia of the Segunda División B. A year later, he joined another Segunda B club, UE Sant Andreu, also on loan.

Gómez signed as a free agent with third-tier club CF Badalona in July 2013. On 23 June of the following year, he moved back to divisional rivals Cornellà.

References

External links
 
 
 

1991 births
Living people
Footballers from Barcelona
Spanish footballers
Association football midfielders
Segunda División players
Segunda División B players
Tercera División players
Villarreal CF C players
Villarreal CF B players
CF Palencia footballers
UE Sant Andreu footballers
CF Badalona players
UE Cornellà players